The pole vault at the World Championships in Athletics has been contested by men since 1983 and women since 1999.

The championship records for the event are 6.05 for men, set by Dmitri Markov in 2001, and 5.01 m for women, set by Yelena Isinbayeva in 2005.

Age records
All information from IAAF

Medalists

Men

Multiple medalists

Medals by country

Women

Multiple medalists

Medals by country

See also
 Pole vault
 Pole vault at the Olympics

References

Bibliography

External links
Official IAAF website

 
World Championships in Athletics
Events at the World Athletics Championships